Thotaravulapadu is a village in NTR district of the Indian state of Andhra Pradesh. It is located in Chandarlapadu mandal of Nandigama revenue division. It is one of the villages in the mandal to be a part of Andhra Pradesh Capital Region.

References 

Villages in NTR district